Charles Snyman (2 August 1922 – 10 May 1991) was a South African cricketer. He played in six first-class matches for Border from 1950/51 to 1953/54.

See also
 List of Border representative cricketers

References

External links
 

1922 births
1991 deaths
South African cricketers
Border cricketers
Cricketers from East London, Eastern Cape